Jeffrey William Schwarz (born May 20, 1964) is an American former professional baseball pitcher.

Early life and family
Schwarz was born in Fort Pierce, Florida, and graduated from Fort Pierce Central High School in Fort Pierce.

Schwarz has four children, two of which are student-athletes at the University of Florida. His daughter Taylor plays first base on the Gators' softball team that won the national title in 2015 and was a member of the class of 2016, while his son J.J., born March 28, 1996, in Palm Beach Gardens, Florida, was drafted by the Milwaukee Brewers in the 17th round in 2014, but chose not to sign. He played his first season for the Florida Gators baseball team as a catcher in 2015, and set the single-season program record for home runs by a freshman, with 18.

Playing career
He played during two seasons at the major league level for the Chicago White Sox and California Angels. He also played one season in Nippon Professional Baseball (NPB) for the Yokohama BayStars. Schwarz was drafted by the Chicago Cubs in the 24th round of the 1982 amateur draft.

Coaching career
He is currently a pitching coach for the GCL Marlins.

References

External links

Baseball Almanac
Japan Central League
Retrosheet
The Baseball Gauge
Venezuela Winter League

1964 births
Living people
American expatriate baseball players in Canada
American expatriate baseball players in Japan
Baseball coaches from Florida
Baseball players from Florida
Birmingham Barons players
California Angels players
Chicago White Sox players
El Paso Diablos players
Gulf Coast Cubs players
Hagerstown Suns players
Leones del Caracas players
American expatriate baseball players in Venezuela
Major League Baseball pitchers
Minor league baseball coaches
Nashville Sounds players
Nippon Professional Baseball pitchers
People from Fort Pierce, Florida
Peoria Chiefs players
Pikeville Cubs players
Pittsfield Cubs players
Quad Cities Cubs players
Richmond Braves players
Rochester Red Wings players
Stockton Ports players
Vancouver Canadians players
Winston-Salem Spirits players
Yokohama BayStars players
American expatriate baseball players in Italy
Rimini Baseball Club players